Samuel Henderson Allen (October 17, 1826 – September 19, 1905) was an American businessman, prison warden, and politician from Maine.

Career 
Henderson was a founding member of the Maine Republican Party. He was elected to the Maine House of Representatives in 1856 from his home in Thomaston. In May 1861, he was named Deputy Collector of Customs of the Port of Thomaston, a patronage position due to the election of Republican Abraham Lincoln.

Military service 
He resigned in October of that year and instead was appointed Major in the 1st Maine Volunteer Cavalry Regiment. He was promoted to colonel the following May. In September 1862, he was appointed military governor of Frederick, Maryland and served until his resignation from the Union Army on January 5, 1863, due to poor health.

Private sector and business career 
After leaving the army, Allen traveled to California and Nevada before returning East. He worked for Charles Gould and Amos Gaylord Throop to purchase land for mining in Kentucky and West Virginia. In 1865, he worked in the oil business of western Pennsylvania. From 1877 to 1888, he was involved in the sale of lumber and ice from Maine's Kennebec River. In 1888, he was appointed Ward of the Maine State Prison, a position held until at least 1900.

Henderson was a member of the Military Order of the Loyal Legion of the United States (MOLLUS) as well as the Grand Army of the Republic (GAR).

Death 
He died in 1905 at the age of 79.

References

1826 births
1905 deaths
People from Cushing, Maine
Republican Party members of the Maine House of Representatives
Businesspeople from Maine
People of Maine in the American Civil War
Union Army colonels
United States military governors
American prison wardens
19th-century American politicians
19th-century American businesspeople